Vittorio Mariani  (29 September 1859 – 15 March 1946) was an Italian architect, active mainly in his native Tuscany.

Biography
Born in Siena, Mariani graduated in architecture at the Accademia di Belle Arti di Roma, where he was a pupil of Giuseppe Partini.

He designed numerous buildings in his native Siena, and contributed to the restoration and renovation of ancient palaces and churches in the old town, including the Rozzi Theatre (1894), San Mamiliano in Valli (1896), the Basilica of San Francesco (1903), Santa Maria della Scala (1905–09), Palazzo Salimbeni (1911–16) and the expansion of the San Niccolò Psychiatric Hospital (1914).

In Grosseto, Mariani designed the Bastiani Grand Hotel (1910–12), the local headquarters of Monte dei Paschi (1912) and the Government Palace (1923–27). He also designed the Post Office Palaces in Siena (1908–12) and in Messina, Sicily (1912–14). He designed the city master plan of Siena in 1931.

References

Bibliography

External links

19th-century Italian architects
20th-century Italian architects
Architects from Tuscany
1859 births
1946 deaths
People from Siena